Runabouts ("Danube-class" vessels) are a fictional class of small, multi-purpose starships appearing in the Star Trek science-fiction franchise, primarily the television series Star Trek: Deep Space Nine, which aired on syndicated television between 1993 and 1999.  They served as a means of transport for the crew of the fictional space station Deep Space Nine, in the early seasons of the series enabling storylines taking place away from the station.

This spacecraft design was created primarily by Herman Zimmerman, Rick Sternbach and Jim Martin in the 1990s for Star Trek: Deep Space Nine, and later used throughout the franchise such as in books, comics, and games.

Role in Deep Space Nine
The idea for the runabout was prompted by the need to provide a way for characters to travel away from Deep Space Nine, allowing the series to feature Star Treks themes of exploration and discovery despite being set on a stationary space station. In order to help the new show establish its own identity separate from The Next Generation, the decision was made to have something larger and more capable than the shuttlecraft seen in previous series of Star Trek.

The series bible describes the Danube-class vessels as "the symbol of the Federation presence in [Deep Space Nines] sector". The Starfleet design elements were intended as a touch of familiarity for the characters (and in turn, the viewers) in environments dominated by alien designs and structures, specifically the Cardassians and Bajorans.

From the third season of DS9 onwards, much of the exploration aspect of the series was facilitated by the starship USS Defiant, which took over much of the runabouts' previous role in allowing characters to move off the station. Defiant was introduced because the producers wanted the series to enable more than two or three characters to travel away from Deep Space Nine at once, while the introduction of the Dominion as an antagonist during the second season created the in-universe requirement for a more powerful and combat-capable starship based at Deep Space Nine.

Design and depiction
Overall design of the runabout was supervised by Herman Zimmerman, with Rick Sternbach and Jim Martin responsible for the design work. According to Sternbach, initial designs for the Danube class were based on the 'Spacedock Ferry' that appeared in the film Star Trek VI: The Undiscovered Country.

The Danube-class vessels are larger than shuttlecraft seen in previous series of Star Trek, but significantly smaller than previously depicted starships. The runabouts are usually named after rivers on Earth.

The hull of the Danube-class runabout is shaped roughly like a long, rectangular box. A downward-curving 'wing' is located on each side of the vessel; these start near the top of the hull, and curve down to the warp nacelles. The runabout's impulse drives are located between the wings and the vessel's body.

The runabouts have a two-person flight crew, and can carry two other crew. They are fitted with a two-person transporter and accommodation bunks for long missions. According to the first season episode "Dax", they were capable of speeds up to Warp 5. Although not explored in the series, background materials indicate the runabout had a modular mission payload system, where the middle section of the runabout could be swapped out for modules carrying different equipment.

Sets
The cockpit set was designed by Joseph Hodges, and constructed over a nine-week period. The set was laid out with the two flight crew facing forward and out the windows, while consoles for the two other crew have them facing the sides of the runabout. The runabout's transporter was located in the centre rear of the compartment.

A remodeling of the set occurred between the second and third seasons, with the primary change being new computer consoles around the cockpit. Another major overhaul occurred between seasons four and five, with the transporter bay moved aft behind a large door (which was usually kept open), and a free-standing console added in its place.

The set was redressed on four occasions to serve as the control areas of other vessels: a Maquis raider during "Caretaker", the pilot episode of Star Trek: Voyager, mirror universe ships in DS9 season three episode "Through the Looking Glass" and season four episode "Shattered Mirror", and a shuttlecraft from USS Enterprise-E in the film Star Trek: Insurrection.

A set for the runabout's aft living quarters was built for "Timescape", an episode in the sixth season of The Next Generation (running concurrently with DS9s first season). The set was designed by Richard James, and was funded from The Next Generations budget, in order to take pressure off DS9s finances. Unlike the cockpit construction, design and fabrication of the aft set had to be completed in nine days. This was the only appearance of the Danube class outside of DS9, and although the set was intended for use on DS9, it was never used again to depict a runabout's interior.

Filming models

The filming model was built by Tony Meininger. Filming of the runabout was done by Image G, along with all other miniature effect work for the series.

One runabout, USS Ganges, appeared in season one episode "Past Prologue" with a 'roll-bar' mounted over the top of the ship. This roll-bar, described as containing sensor equipment, was added to the model to help viewers distinguish between Ganges and the runabout USS Yangtzee Kiang during a chase sequence.

Eight subsequent episodes of DS9 show Danube-class ships with roll-bars, including second season episode "The Maquis, Part II", where two runabouts with roll-bars are depicted flying alongside a third, without the roll-bar. A prototype for an updated runabout design, the Yellowstone class, appears in an alternate timeline depicted in the Voyager episode "Non Sequitur". This episode used stock footage from various DS9 episodes; incongruously, the runabout's destruction depicts the vessel with a roll-bar, while all previous scenes show the vessel without one.

Season six episode "One Little Ship" had a runabout carrying Jadzia Dax (Terry Farrell), Julian Bashir (Alexander Siddig), and Miles O'Brien (Colm Meaney) shrunk down to tiny size, then having to rescue the rest of the cast when Defiant is captured by the Dominion. Screenwriter René Echevarria conceived the 'little ship show' idea as a comedic filler episode early in The Next Generations run, but despite suggesting it multiple times, did not receive the chance to go ahead until late in DS9s run. The model was mounted on a specially built three-axis head, which allowed for easier miniature effect work than with the original filming model.

Computer-generated imagery model
Season six episode "Change of Heart" depicts a runabout traversing an asteroid field, then landing on a planet. This was the first episode in which runabout sequences were done completely with computer-generated imagery: complex scenes where the ship weaved through the dense asteroid field were achieved without weeks of miniature effect work, and camera movements during the landing sequence allowed the runabout to be shown from multiple angles in the same scene, as there was no need to conceal a 'mounting point' for the miniature. The CGI model for the Danube class was developed by Digital Muse.

Appearances

Danube class

Yellowstone class (alternate reality)

Disposability
A large number of runabouts are damaged or destroyed over the course of the series. In the third-season episode "Family Business", Kira Nerys (Nana Visitor) quips, "The rate we go through runabouts, it's a good thing the Earth has so many rivers" (referencing the naming tradition of the Danube-class vessels), and in Star Trek 101, authors Terry Erdmann and Paula Block comment that the series "goes through runabouts like potato chips".

The show's art department joked that any runabout travel should be done on the USS Rio Grande, referring to its distinction as the only Danube-class ship to survive the entire seven-season run of DS9, and therefore the safest one. It appeared in the series pilot "Emissary", the final episode "What You Leave Behind", and eighteen other episodes in between.

Merchandise
In 1993, AMT/Ertl released a 1:72 scale model kit for the runabout USS Rio Grande. During the filming of season two, one of these models was put together by the show's art department for a miniature effect shot where a runabout exploded, instead of having to assemble, then destroy, a more-expensive filming model. Later, the company released a 1:2500 scale model of Deep Space Nine itself, which included three runabouts to place on the station's landing pads.

In 1994, Playmates Toys released a "Runabout Orinoco" playset, in which two of Playmates'  action figures could be seated.

A runabout was amongst the Star Trek Micro Machines produced by Galoob. As well as the standard toy, bronzed and silvered versions have been released in collectors' sets.

Several 'ship' cards from Decipher, Inc.'s Star Trek Customizable Card Game depicted Danube-class ships. A generic Runabout card (based on the appearance in The Next Generation) was included in the original set, with named runabouts appearing in subsequent sets.

Runabouts appear in several incarnations in the Star Trek Online massively multiplayer online role-playing game. Danube and Yellowstone classes appear as both playable 'small craft' starships and as decorative non-combat pets to be displayed when using larger starships. The Danube-class starship and pet correspond to the DS9 appearance, with the roll bar equipped. However, the Yellowstone runabouts have a different visual design to the ship's appearance in Star Trek: Voyager.

Reception 
In 2017, CBR ranked the runabout the fifteenth most powerful spacecraft of Star Trek: Deep Space Nine. They note they were an important vessel in the television show early on before the arrival of the USS Defiant spacecraft. They felt they were a big upgrade over smaller shuttlecraft of the period, and while they land the occasionally lucky shot against larger starships, they were no match for them in general.

Citations

See also
 Star Trek: The Next Generation
 Star Trek: Deep Space Nine
 Star Trek: Voyager

References

Books

Journal articles

Websites

External links

 Danube class at Memory Beta
 Unnamed Danube class starships
 Runabouts with Rollbars - Webpage identifying the occurrences of the 'roll-bar' across episodes of DS9
 Variations of the Runabout Interior - Web page tracking the changes of the runabout cockpit set over the course of DS9
 Danube Class Runabout at Maquis Forces International -  Runabout Graphics/Schematics

Star Trek spacecraft
Star Trek: Deep Space Nine

it:Astronavi di Star Trek#Classe Danube